Rodney (New Glasgow) Airport  is located  southeast of Rodney, Ontario, Canada.

References

Registered aerodromes in Ontario